Bare is a village in Leposavić, northern Kosovo. It is inhabited by an ethnic Albanian majority.

Notes

Villages in Leposavić